Android: Netrunner is a Living Card Game (LCG) produced by Fantasy Flight Games. It is a two-player game set in the dystopian future of the Android universe. Each game is played as a battle between a megacorporation and a hacker ("runner") in a duel to take control of data. It is based on Richard Garfield's Netrunner collectible card game, produced by Wizards of the Coast in 1996.

In 2017, a second edition of the core set was announced which replaced some of the original cards with cards from the first two expansion cycles. In 2018, the game was discontinued due to the license with Wizards of the Coast ending. Fantasy Flight stated that Netrunner products will no longer be sold by them as of October 22, 2018, and Reign and Reverie was the last expansion.

Gameplay
Like the original, the game is asymmetric and involves two players, one playing a hacker ("the Runner") and the other playing a corporation ("the Corp"). The Runner wins by stealing seven or more points worth of agenda cards or if the Corp can't draw a card when required (due to an empty deck). The Corp wins by scoring agenda cards worth a total of seven or more points or if the Runner is forced to discard more cards than they have in their hand.

Differences from the original
While the game retains much of the gameplay of the original, there are some key differences:

The original Netrunner game was sold in randomized booster packs and semi-random starter decks, similar to Magic: The Gathering and other collectible card games. Fantasy Flight's version has been built like its other Living Card Games. The expansions are sold in fixed, non-random sets, either as monthly packs ("Data Packs"), or, less frequently, deluxe box expansions. While this approach virtually eliminates the secondary card market, card speculation, and draft formats, it also promotes an equal playing field and game play over the value of the cards.
Fantasy Flight reprinted the original card set and various data packs after they sold out; this is similar to the company's support of its other Living Card Games. Collectible card games (like Magic) do not reprint card sets, preferring to re-build the card base and help support a secondary card market and card pricing speculation.
The setting for the original game was based on the Cyberpunk 2020 RPG. The game has been moved to Fantasy Flight's Android setting.
The original game had only two factions: Corp and Runner. The new version splits the two factions into four Corps (Jinteki, NBN, Haas-Bioroid, and the Weyland Consortium) and three core Runner types (Anarch, Criminal, and Shaper) as well as 3 Runner mini-factions (Adam, Apex, and Sunny Lebeau). Every deck must have an identity card from one of these factions. This card may grant one or more special abilities and sets deck-building constraints.
A deck cannot have more than three copies of a single card (by name) in it, unless specifically stated on the card. In the original game, no limit was imposed. 
In the original game, the corp had a maximum deck size for specific numbers of agenda points (for example, 18-19 agenda points meant a maximum deck size of 45 cards, 20-21 agenda points meant max 50 cards, and so on). In the new game, the relationship is reversed; a deck size interval is tied to a number of agenda points (for example, a 45-49 card deck must have 20-21 agenda points). This means that the corporation must decide between using the lower number for more consistency, the higher number for lower agenda density, or somewhere in between.
Some terminology has changed: bits have been replaced with credits, actions replaced by clicks, and data forts replaced by servers.  Also, some card types have been renamed (for example, Prep cards are now Events).
Some mechanics have been simplified or otherwise altered.
 In the original game, the "trace" mechanic was a blind bid, with both players revealing their bids simultaneously. Now traces are done openly, with the Corp bidding first, followed by the Runner.
 In the original game, the Corporation would lose the game if they received 7 Bad Publicity tokens. In Android: Netrunner the Corporation can have any number of Bad Publicity tokens without fear of losing, but each Bad Publicity token gives the Runner a free "temporary use" credit to use during each run.
Due to these changes, cards from the two games are not interchangeable. Richard Garfield has stated that "almost all [changes] are reasonable simplifications or elaborations on the original mechanics", and that he is "confident that care was taken not to change for the sake of change."

Expansions

Cycles
Each Data Pack contained 60 cards, had a complete playset of new cards (typically three copies each of twenty cards), and was part of a six-pack "cycle". A new pack was released monthly during the cycle; between cycles the wait was typically three to four months.

Genesis

Spin

Lunar

SanSan

Mumbad

Flashpoint

Red Sands

Kitara

Deluxe expansions
Deluxe expansions are released between cycles. Deluxe expansions originally focused on two factions (one Corporation and one Runner) and contain three copies of 55 cards. The fourth and fifth deluxe expansions break from this pattern; the fourth introduces three new Runner "mini-factions" along with its focus on a Corporation, while the fifth includes cards for all 7 factions and 3 mini-factions.

Narrative campaign expansions
Narrative campaign expansions include new player cards (including Runner and Corp identities), printed player dashboards (referred to as "PAD sheets") to hold stickers that will affect future games played in the same campaign setting, and packs of secret campaign cards and stickers. A Core Set is required to play a narrative campaign expansion.

Organized play 

Android: Netrunner World Championships occur annually during Fantasy Flight's World Championships. National, regional, and store championships precede this; each event's first-place winner receives a first-round bye in the following level of tournament play. Android: Netrunner tournaments follow a Swiss-system similar to that of Magic: the Gathering, though with a key difference: only two games are played, with each player playing as the Corporation and Runner once. In most tournaments, however, after a certain number of rounds all except the top eight or sixteen players are cut from the tournament. The tournament then shifts to double-elimination bracket, eventually crowning a winner. 

Game Night Kit (GNK) tournaments are also run at times between other organized play events and usually follow the same structure, but without any byes to other events being available as prizes.

Rotation 
In November 2014, Fantasy Flight Games announced the concept of rotation, wherein cycles are periodically phased out and considered illegal for tournament play. Under these rules, 5-7 cycles would be legal at any given time, as well as the core set and Deluxe Expansions (which will always remain legal). The first two cycles, Genesis and Spin, rotated out in October 2017, prior to the release of the eighth cycle, Kitara. Following this, rotation would occur every two cycles, or around every year. In September 2017, Fantasy Flight Games announced a revision of the core set, rotating out some of the cards in the original core set, while retaining some from the Genesis and Spin cycles.

Draft 
Draft is an alternate way to play Android: Netrunner, in which players begin the tournament without a deck, rather a randomized, unopened pack of cards. Players have eight packs of ten cards, four each for the Corporation and Runner. Each player begins by looking at their cards in one pack, choosing a card from it, then passing it to another player (either to their left or right, depending on which number pack is being drafted). Each player then selects one of the remaining cards from the pack he or she just received, and passes the remaining cards again. This process continues until no cards are left in the packs. Following this, players repeat the same process with each pack. After this, players are given time to make a Corporation and Runner deck out of the cards drafted, then play a tournament in the same style as standard Android: Netrunner.

A variety of "Draft Packs" are available to draft with. Cards included within the Draft Packs can be either previously released cards or soon to be released. Certain draft cards are unique to draft and illegal in standard tournaments, and are marked as such on the card.

Fan continuation
A fan-led organization named Nextrunner International Support & Expansion Initiative (NISEI) launched after FFG announced it had ended publication of the game. NISEI's stated mission is "to keep the game alive and thriving after the end of the official FFG era." NISEI arranges prize kits for casual game nights (known as GNKs) and Store and Regional Championship competitive events, as well as arranging tournaments at the National, Continental and World Championship levels.

NISEI has also provided ongoing support for the game by curating the card pool, by both "rotating" existing cards out of tournament-legal status and introducing new cards. The organization developed an updated core set for the game, entitled System Core 2019, and designed a new cycle of cards, the Ashes cycle, consisting of two 65-card packs, Downfall and Uprising. NISEI also maintains the list of cards banned and restricted from competitive play and updates rules documents to provide a comprehensive rules system for the game. Additionally, they have also published and enforce a Code of Conduct which prioritizes diversity, equality, and inclusion. In 2022, NISEI changed its name to Null Signal Games.

Netrunner compatible NISEI releases

Ashes

Magnum Opus reprint

System

Borealis

Awards
Android: Netrunner has won the 2012 Best Card Game and 2012 Best Two Player Game, at the 2012 BoardGameGeek Golden Geek Awards.

References

External links
Official Website

Cyberpunk games
Video games about virtual reality
Fantasy Flight Games games
Card games introduced in 2012